Hazardia ferrisiae is a Mexican species of shrub in the family Asteraceae. It has been found only in the state of Baja California in northwestern Mexico.

Hazardia ferrisiae grows on the coastal plain on the Pacific side of the peninsula. The plant produces  flower heads singly or in small clusters of 2 or 3, each head with 5-6 disc flowers but no ray flowers.

References

Flora of Baja California
ferrisiae
Plants described in 1884